Downset (usually stylized as downset.) is an American rap metal band from Los Angeles, California. Originally called Social Justice, the band's music blends influences from rap, funk, hardcore punk, and metal with "socially aware lyrics."

Band history

Formation and early releases (1989–1993) 
The band's original moniker was Social Justice. They began as a hardcore punk band. They released their debut album, Unity Is Strength, in 1989 and the EP I Refuse to Lose under this name with a different lineup in 1992. They were known as being one of the first hardcore bands to incorporate hip hop and funk influences into their music.

In 1992, Social Justice (1987–92) changed their name to Downset, and released the Our Suffocation demo in 1993. The album, which explored various social issues such as the death of lead singer Rey Oropeza's father at the hands of the LAPD, was praised by critics. During this transition, they changed their sound by heavily incorporating rap metal and funk metal.

Mercury Records, downset. and Do We Speak A Dead Language? (1994–1998) 
In 1994, Downset signed a deal with Mercury Records, a subsidiary of Polygram Records, and released their self-titled effort in the same year. In 1994, downset began gaining popularity in Europe after touring there with Biohazard and Dog Eat Dog, followed by a tour with Pantera and The Almighty later that year. In early 1995, Downset returned to Europe with Sullen for a massive headlining tour. In 1995, they also appeared at some major rock festivals throughout the continent including Roskilde and Dynamo. In 1996, the band released their most commercially successful album, Do We Speak A Dead Language?, through Mercury.

Post-Mercury years, Check Your People and Universal (1998–2009) 
After making their departure from Mercury Records, Downset were scooped up by Epitaph Records and released their third album, Check Your People, in 2000.  In 2004, Downset released their fourth album, Universal, on an independent record label Hawino Records. In recognition of the band's album release on Epitaph Records, "Pure Trauma" taken from the album "Check your People," was included on the 2001 multi-artist compilation "Punk O Rama Vol. 6". The band disbanded in 2009.

Reunion and One Blood (2013–2014) 
On July 21, 2014, Downset's first new album in ten years, One Blood, was released worldwide.

Signing to Nuclear Blast and Maintain (2022) 
After a period of prolonged inactivity, Downset announced in February 2022 that they had signed to Nuclear Blast Records, and announced plans for a new studio album as well as reissues of their demo singles "Anger/Ritual" and "About Ta Blast". On April 29, the band announced their new album, Maintain, would be released on June 10, 2022, and released the album's first single, "The Place To Be". The album sold 200 copies in its first week of sales.

Legacy 
Though Downset never experienced any mainstream success, and though its members came from an urban hardcore tradition rather than from metal, the band is still regarded as a noteworthy influence on the then-nascent nu metal and rap metal subgenres. In addition to headlining the second stage at Ozzfest in 1997, downset. toured with prominent bands such as Linkin Park, Pantera, Slayer, Metallica, Red Hot Chili Peppers, Korn, Snoop Dogg, Testament and Anthrax.

Band members
Current
Rey Oropeza – vocals (1989–present)
Rogelio Lozano – guitar (1989–1994, 1999–2002, 2013, 2019-present)
Phillip Gonzales – bass guitar (2019–present)
Bobby Blood – drums (2019–present)

Former members
Brian "Ares" Schwager – guitar (1989–2016)
Christopher "Krasp" Lee – drums (1989–1999, 2001–2005, 2013)
Chris Hamilton – drums (1999–2001, 2014–2019)
James Morris – bass guitar (1989–2003, 2014–2019)
Rico Villasenor – bass guitar (2003–2005)

Former touring musicians
Dave Corsile – guitar (2000–2001, Check Your People Japan / US Tour)

Discography

Albums
Social Justice
Unity is Strength (1989)
downset.

EPs
Social Justice
I Refuse To Lose (1992)
downset.
Our Suffocation (demo) (1994)
Downset EP (1995)
Generation of Hope (with Shootyz Groove) (1995)
Live at Foundation's Forum  (1995)
No More Freedom in a Cage (1996)
 Eyes Shut Tight EP' (Live at CBGB's) (1997)
Code Blue Coma (2000)
 Rarities (2000)

Singles
"About Ta Blast" (1993)
"Anger" (1994)
"Downset" (1995)
"Empower" (1996)
"Pocket Full of Fatcaps" (1996)
"Eyes Shut Tight" (1996)
 "Split with Mindbug 7" (1999)
"Jumping Off" (2004)
"One Blood" (2014)
"The Place To Be" (2022)

References

Notes

External links

Downset interview

Check Your People review at AllMusic
Universal review at AllMusic

Musical groups established in 1989
Musical groups disestablished in 2009
Rap metal musical groups
Rap rock groups
American funk metal musical groups
Rapcore groups
Funk rock musical groups
Epitaph Records artists
Musical groups from Los Angeles
Heavy metal musical groups from California
Alternative rock groups from California
American alternative metal musical groups
1989 establishments in California
End Hits Records artists